Francis Chipperfield (2 December 1895 – 1979) was an English footballer who played in the Football League for Ashington, Lincoln City and Middlesbrough.

References

1895 births
1979 deaths
English footballers
Association football forwards
English Football League players
Gateshead A.F.C. players
Blyth Spartans A.F.C. players
Leeds City F.C. players
Lincoln City F.C. players
Middlesbrough F.C. players
Carlisle United F.C. players
Ashington A.F.C. players
People from Shiremoor
Footballers from Tyne and Wear